"Perdóname" is a song by Latin Grammy nominated Spanish singer Pablo Alborán, from his self-titled debut album. A concert in Madrid in May 2011 was recorded as a duet with Carminho and released the lead single from his live album, En Acústico in November 2011.

The live single was released on 3 October 2011 as a digital download in Spain. The song was written by Pablo Alborán and produced by Manuel Illán. It features a duet with Portuguese fado singer Carminho.

The song is the theme of the Brazilian telenovela A Lei do Amor starring Cláudia Abreu and Reynaldo Gianecchini.

Video
The music video was shot in Lisbon, Portugal, and features Alborán and Carminho ambulating by some of the most typical sights of the Portuguese capital.

Track listing

Chart performance
The song debuted at number 7 on the Spanish Singles Chart on the week of release, and reached the top spot on 13 November 2011, becoming Alborán's second number-one single.

Weekly charts

Year-end charts

Certifications

Release history

See also
 List of number-one singles of 2011 (Spain)

References

External links
 Official website

2011 singles
Pablo Alborán songs
Number-one singles in Spain
Male–female vocal duets
Songs written by Pablo Alborán
EMI Records singles
2011 songs
Carminho songs